Mustapha Boukar (born 2 November 1962) is an Algerian former footballer who famously played as a number 10 for ASM Oran, the club of the town where he was born. He was nicknamed Paulo César referring to the Brazilian player of the 1970s who was also known as Caju. Boukar played in Belgium between 1991 and 1993.

Honours
 Runners-up of the Algerian Cup with ASM Oran in 1981 and 1983

External links

Player statistics - dzfootball

1962 births
Living people
Footballers from Oran
Algerian footballers
Algeria international footballers
Algerian expatriate footballers
Algerian expatriate sportspeople in Belgium
Expatriate footballers in Belgium
ASM Oran players
MC Oran players
Association football midfielders
21st-century Algerian people